Timothy Hollingsworth (born, January 30, 1980) is an American chef and restaurateur. In 2012, he left his post as Chef de Cuisine at Thomas Keller’s The French Laundry and moved to Los Angeles, where he opened Otium. He has won multiple awards throughout his career, including the 2010 James Beard Foundation's Rising Chef of the Year Award, the 2010 San Francisco Chronicle Rising Star Chef, and the 2009 Bocuse d'Or, where he placed sixth. He was the winner of the 2018 cooking competition The Final Table.

Life and career 
Timothy Hollingsworth was born in Houston, Texas. In 1980, his mother Karen Hollingsworth and father Quintin Hollingsworth took their five children and moved to Placerville, California. Being raised as a Southern Baptist in Texas, religion and family dinners were parts of his upbringing. Hollingsworth worked in construction with his father until he was 18, when he landed a dishwashing gig at one of the nicest restaurants in the area.  Hollingsworth worked his way up to a sous chef position.

In 2001, Hollingsworth began as a commis at The French Laundry in Napa Valley, California. Hollingsworth learned from former chefs de cuisine Eric Ziebold and Corey Lee. In 2004, Keller selected Hollingsworth as part of a team that traveled to New York City to train and prepare for the opening of his new restaurant Per Se. After returning to The French Laundry, Hollingsworth was promoted to sous chef in 2005 and in 2009, to chef de cuisine. Throughout his career at The French Laundry, Hollingsworth staged in France, Germany and England under European Chefs Gordon Ramsay, Michel Rostang and Alain Senderens.

In 2012, Hollingsworth left The French Laundry and moved to Los Angeles, California to pursue his own ventures. He began consulting in the United States, Korea, and Lebanon. In 2014, he opened Barrel & Ashes, a southern barbecue restaurant. Upon leaving Barrel & Ashes, he partnered with The Eli and Edythe Broad Foundation to open Otium in Downtown Los Angeles. In August 2018, he opened C.J. Boyd's at The Fields LA. 

Hollingsworth married his wife Caroline in 2015. They have three children.

Awards 
 Sixth Place Winner: Bocuse d'Or, 2009
 Rising Star Chef of the Year: California, James Beard Foundation, 2010
 Rising Star Chef: SF Chronicle, 2010
 Winner of the 2018 The Final Table

Television Appearances 
 Top Chef, season 6 episode 12 (guest judge)
 Guilty Pleasures, Food Network, season 1
 The Final Table, Netflix, season 1

References

Team United States 2009 dossier Bocuse d'Or

Footnotes

1980 births
Living people
American chefs
American restaurateurs
American male chefs
Chefs of French cuisine
James Beard Foundation Award winners
Chefs from Los Angeles